The 2007 Colonial Cup was rugby union competition held in Fiji. The Fiji Rugby Union controls the Colonial Cup which is used to pick players for the Fiji national team.

This year saw the emergence of a new team, the Bligh Roosters, based in Tavua. This took  the number of competing teams to 6.

The Coastal Stallions were the 2007 champions, this being their third win since the tournament's inception in 2004.

Teams  

Coastal Stallions - Nadroga
Suva Highlanders - Suva, Naitasiri
Western Crusaders - Lautoka, Nadi, Ba
Tailevu Knights - Tailevu, Nasinu
Northern Sharks - Vanua Levu
Bligh Roosters - Tavua, Rakiraki

Results from 2007

Round 1

Round 2

Round 3

Round 4

Round 5

Final standings
{| class="wikitable"
|-
!width=165|Team
!width=40|Played
!width=40|Won
!width=40|Drawn
!width=40|Lost
!width=40|For
!width=40|Against
!width=40|Point Difference
!width=40|Bonus Points
!width=40|Points
|- bgcolor=#ccffcc align=center
|align=left| Crusaders
|5||4||0||1||88||62||+26||1||17
|- bgcolor=#ccffcc align=center
|align=left| Stallions
|5||3||0||2||117||111||+6||4||16 
|- bgcolor=#ccffcc align=center
|align=left| Highlanders
|5||3||0||2||112||86||+26||3||15
|- bgcolor=#ccffcc align=center
|align=left| Knights
|5||3||0||2||116||96||+20||3||15
|- align=center
|align=left| Sharks
|5||2||0||3||96||105||-9||4||12
|- align=center
|align=left| Roosters
|5||0||0||5||68||137||-69||1||1
|}

4 points for a win; 2 for a draw; 1 bonus point for scoring four or more tries in a match; 1 bonus point for losing by 7 points or less.

Semi-finals

Grand final

External links
 Colonial Cup pages from Teivovo
 Colonial Cup pages from Fiji Rugby Union

Colonial Cup (rugby union)
2007 rugby union tournaments for clubs
2007 in Fijian rugby union